The ATP rankings are the Association of Tennis Professionals' (ATP) merit-based system for determining the rankings in men's tennis. In doubles, the top-ranked team is the pair who, over the previous 52 weeks, has gathered the most ATP rankings points. Points are awarded based on how far a team advances in tournaments and the category of those tournaments. The ATP has used a computerized system for determining doubles rankings since 1976. An updated rankings list is released at the beginning of each week.

Since the introduction of the ATP rankings the method used to calculate a player's ranking points has changed several times. As of 2017, ranking is based on calculating, for each player, his total points from his best 18 results from all eligible tournaments, including the ATP Finals (Doubles) played in the 52-week ranking period. For entry purposes there are no mandatory events, however, once a player is accepted in the main draw of one of these 12 tournaments, as a direct acceptance, a qualifier or a lucky loser or having accepted a wild card, his result in this tournament shall count for his ranking, whether or not he participates.

Rajeev Ram is the oldest doubles player to debut atop the rankings.

The current co-world No. 1 players in doubles are Dutch player Wesley Koolhof and British player Neal Skupski.

ATP No. 1 ranked doubles players 
Data is from the ATP. The doubles rankings began on March 1, 1976.

Weeks at No. 1

Weeks at No. 1 leaders timeline

Year-end number 1 
The year-end No. 1 ranked player is determined based on the ATP rankings following the completion of the final tournament of the calendar year. For doubles, two rankings are maintained, one for the individual player or players with the most points, and one for the team with the most points at the end of the season.

Players who became No. 1 without having won a Grand Slam

Weeks at No. 1 by decade 
 Note: Current No. 1 player indicated in italic.

1970s

1980s

1990s

2000s

2010s

2020s 

 * Stats are automatically updated on Mondays (UTC).

Weeks at number 1 by country 
 Current No. 1 player indicated in bold.

See also 
 List of ATP number 1 ranked singles tennis players
 List of WTA number 1 ranked singles tennis players
 List of WTA number 1 ranked doubles tennis players
 ITF World Champions
 Current ATP rankings
 List of highest ranked tennis players per country
 List of male doubles tennis players

References

External links 
 ATP Tour website

 
ATP
1